Clausena excavata is a species of evergreen shrub that grows  tall, in the family Rutaceae, native to Bangladesh, Bhutan, Cambodia, China, India, Indonesia, Laos, Malaysia, Myanmar, Nepal, the Philippines, Taiwan, Thailand, and Vietnam. The plant is commonly by various names, including pink lime-berry, cama, cemama, cemamar, cerek, cerek hitam, kemantu hitam, secerek, semeru, and suntang hitam.

Uses 
The leaves are used in Southeast Asian cooking, emitting a curry-like smell when crushed. The plant's berries are also edible and have an anise flavour. The plant is astringent, bitter, emmenagogue and considered a tonic for digestive problems.

One of the phytochemicals the plant contains is lichexanthone.

References

excavata
Flora of tropical Asia
Plants described in 1768
Taxa named by Nicolaas Laurens Burman